Nanorana blanfordii (common names: Blanford's frog, Blanford's paa frog, Blanford's spiny frog, Blanford's hill frog) is a species of frog in the family Dicroglossidae. It is found in northeastern India, southern Tibet (China), and eastern Nepal, and likely in the adjacent western Bhutan. The specific name blanfordii honours William Thomas Blandford, a British geologist and zoologist.

Description
Nanorana blanfordii are medium-sized frogs, though relatively small among their closest relatives: adult males measure  and adult females  in snout–vent length. The snout is rounded. The tympanum is not very distinct. The finger and toe tips bears discs; the toes are webbed. The dorsum is grey-brown and has some black markings with white margins. There are two black triangular marks between the eyes. The underparts are white.

Habitat and conservation
Breeding takes place in streams, and the eggs are laid in water under stones.

Nanorana blanfordii is rare in China, whereas its population size is unknown elsewhere. Threats to it are unknown. It occurs in the Yadong National Nature Reserve in Tibet.

References 

blanfordii
Amphibians of China
Frogs of India
Amphibians of Nepal
Fauna of Tibet
Amphibians described in 1882
Taxa named by George Albert Boulenger
Taxonomy articles created by Polbot